This is a list of settlements in Boeotia, Greece.

 Agia Anna
 Agia Triada
 Agios Dimitrios
 Agios Georgios
 Agios Spyridonas
 Agios Thomas
 Agios Vlasios
 Akontio
 Akraifnio
 Alalkomenes
 Aliartos
 Alyki
 Ampelochori
 Anthochori
 Antikyra
 Arachova
 Arma
 Askri
 Asopia
 Chaeronea
 Chostia
 Dafni
 Davleia
 Dionysos
 Distomo
 Domvraina
 Eleonas
 Ellopia
 Evangelistria
 Kallithea
 Kaparelli
 Karya
 Kastro
 Kleidi
 Kokkino
 Koroneia
 Kyriaki
 Lafystio
 Lefktra
 Leontari
 Livadeia
 Loutoufio
 Loutsio
 Mavrommati
 Mavroneri
 Melissochori
 Mouriki
 Neochoraki
 Neochori
 Oinofyta 
 Oinoi
 Orchomenos
 Paralia Distomou
 Parori 
 Pavlos
 Petra
 Plaka Dilesi
 Plataies
 Profitis Ilias
 Prosilio
 Pyli
 Pyrgos
 Romaiiko
 Schimatari
 Skourta
 Solinari
 Stefani
 Steiri
 Tanagra
 Thebes
 Thespies
 Thisvi
 Thourio
 Tsoukalades
 Vagia
 Vasilika
 Xironomi
 Ypato
 Ypsilantis

By municipality

See also
List of towns and villages in Greece

 
Boeotia